The Human Animal: A Personal View of the Human Species is a BBC nature documentary series written and presented by Desmond Morris, first transmitted on BBC1 in the United Kingdom from 27 July 1994. The series was produced in association with Discovery Channel.

Morris describes it as "A study of human behavior from a zoological perspective." He travels the world, filming the diverse customs and habits of various regions while suggesting common roots. At the close of episode one, Morris said:

Episodes

1. "The Language of the Body" 

 Gestures: Greetings, Insults, Signals, Gesticulations, body language
 Facial Expressions: Stares, Smiles, Tells

2. "The Hunting Ape" 

 Diet: Fondness for sweets, Culinary variety
 Evolution: Arboreal vegetarianism, Savannah meat-eating, Cooperative hunting with weapons, Food preparation, Aquatic ape hypothesis
 Vestigial hunting behavior: Jobs, Sport Hunting, War

3. "The Human Zoo" 

 Urban Tribalism: Familiarity, Theft, Uniforms, Rituals, Conflict, Social status, Territory

4. "Biology of Love" 

 Courtship: Finding partners, Gender signals, Dating, Tie signs, Pair bonding, Sexual intercourse

5. "The Immortal Genes" 

 Life cycle: Infant-parent interaction, Baby signals, Child behavior, Rites of passage, Cultural indoctrination, Fighting aging, Grandparenting, Afterlives

6. "Beyond Survival" 

 Creativity: Body adornment, Architectural embellishments, Vehicles, Art
 Artistic progression: Innate scribbling, Realism
 Play: Childhood experimentation, Adult inventiveness, Sports, Thrill-seeking, Symbolic thinking

Erratum: Firewalking has been explained.

Public reaction 
Despite sufficient warnings previously given to the public, there remained controversy regarding the 4th episode (Biology of Love) which featured sexually explicit scenes of a couple making love and an intimate study of an orgasm filmed inside a woman's body which attracted an audience of more than 12 million.  The woman, 31-year-old Wendy Duffield, compounded the controversy further when she told a newspaper that "the only thing that wasn't faked was the orgasm".  Mrs Duffield, who made love with her husband, 38-year-old Tony, three times a day for three weeks for the cameras, said many scenes were added later using filmographic "tricks" to fool the viewers.  The BBC added that this was a normal standard practice in documentary film-making.

Video and book 

The accompanying book, The Human Animal by Desmond Morris, was published by BBC Books in 1994.

References

External links 
 Amazon VHS
 Amazon Book
 

1994 British television series debuts
1994 British television series endings
1990s British documentary television series
BBC television documentaries
Documentary television shows about evolution
English-language television shows